Disc (known from 1964 to 1966 as Disc Weekly, and from 1966 until its demise as Disc and Music Echo) is a former British weekly pop music newspaper, published between 1958 and 1975. From its launch until 1967, Disc compiled its own record chart, the third (following New Musical Express, the Record Mirror, and Melody Maker with which it competed). Disc initially compiled its chart from 25 random phone calls to dealers across the United Kingdom, in a manner similar to two of its rivals. The first chart, published in its premiere issue of 8 February 1958, saw "Jailhouse Rock" by Elvis Presley tied with "The Story of My Life" by Michael Holliday for the number-one spot.

At the outset, Discs chart was a Top Twenty, compiled by phone from 25 random dealers' returns all over the UK. The chart expanded to a Top 30 on 6 October 1962; between 23 April 1966 and 25 March 1967, the chart was Top 50 before reverting to a Top 30 chart on 1 April. By 1962, Discs phone sample pool was 50, expanded to 80-100 by 1964 before dropping to a 30-50 pool toward the end of its run as an independently-compiled chart. On 19 August 1967, the paper stopped compiling its own chart (its last number-one single being "San Francisco (Be Sure to Wear Flowers in Your Hair)" by Scott McKenzie) and started publishing Melody Maker'''s Top 30 chart.

Record charts in the United Kingdom began life on 14 November 1952 when NME imitated an idea started in American Billboard magazine and began compiling a hit parade. Prior to 15 February 1969, when the British Market Research Bureau chart was established, there had been no universally accepted chart. During this time the BBC used aggregated results of charts from the Mirror and other sources to compile the Pick of the Pops chart. However, according to the Official Charts Company and Guinness' British Hit Singles & Albums, the NME is considered the official British singles chart before 10 March 1960. After that date and until 1969 a chart compiled by Record Retailer is considered the official British singles chart.

The first number-one record on the Disc chart not to have reached the top of the NME chart was "Bird Dog" by The Everly Brothers. From then until the end of Disc''s independently-compiled chart, they would have an additional eighteen number-ones that are not recognised as number-one by the Official Charts Company, the last of which was Harry Secombe's version of "This Is My Song" in 1967.

Number-one singles

Notes

References

Lists of number-one songs in the United Kingdom